Busenaz Sürmeneli (born 26 May 1998) is a Turkish Olympic and world champion boxer.

Personal life
Busenaz Sürmeneli was born in Bursa, Turkey on 25 May 1998. She grew up in Trabzon, where her family had moved due to her father's profession. In her childhood, she wanted to play in the local women's football team. At the age of ten, she switched over to boxing with the guidance of Cahit Süme, technical director of the Turkey national boxing team. She studied Physical Education and Sport at Trabzon University.

Boxing career
She won several times titles at youth championships.

Sürmeneli took the silver medal at the 2017 Women's European Union Amateur Boxing Championships in Cascia, Italy. She won the bronze medal at the 2019 Women's European Amateur Boxing Championships in Alcobendas, Spain. She became world champion at the 2019 AIBA Women's World Boxing Championships held in Ulan-Ude, Russia. In February 2020, she captured the gold medal in the 69 kg division at the 64th Bocskai István Memorial International Boxing Tournament held in Debrecen, Hungary.

Sürmeneli became champion in the welterweight event at the 2020 Summer Olympics. By defeating China’s Gu Hong, Surmeneli sealed the first-ever Olympics medal in boxing for Turkey at Kokugikan Arena in the Japanese capital. She has displayed exceptional form throughout the tournament, winning all her bouts with a one-sided 5:0 result.

Sürmeneli won the gold medal in the 2022 IBA Women's World Boxing Championships in Istanbul. Surmeneli beat her Canadian opponent Charlie Cavanagh in the final of  welter weight, to become world champion for a second time.

References

External links
 

1998 births
Living people
Sportspeople from Trabzon
Turkish women boxers
Welterweight boxers
AIBA Women's World Boxing Championships medalists
World welterweight boxing champions
European Games competitors for Turkey
Boxers at the 2019 European Games
Boxers at the 2020 Summer Olympics
Olympic boxers of Turkey
Medalists at the 2020 Summer Olympics
Olympic gold medalists for Turkey
Olympic medalists in boxing
Mediterranean Games gold medalists for Turkey
Mediterranean Games medalists in boxing
Competitors at the 2022 Mediterranean Games
20th-century Turkish sportswomen
21st-century Turkish sportswomen